An activity stream is a list of recent activities performed by an individual, typically on a single website. For example, Facebook's News Feed is an activity stream. Since the introduction of the News Feed on September 6, 2006, other major websites have introduced similar implementations for their own users. Since the proliferation of activity streams on websites, there have been calls to standardize the format so that websites could interact with a stream provided by another website. The Activity Streams project, for example, is an effort to develop an activity stream protocol to syndicate activities across social web applications. Several major websites with activity stream implementations have already opened up their activity streams to developers to use, including Facebook and MySpace.

Though activity stream arises from social networking, nowadays it has become an essential part of business software. Enterprise social software is used in different types of companies to organize their internal communication and acts as an addition to traditional corporate intranet. Collaboration software like Jive Software, Yammer, and Chatter offer activity stream as a separate product.

Activity streams come in two different variations:
 Generic feeds: all users see the same content in the activity stream. 
 Personalised feeds: each user gets bespoke items as well as custom ranking of each element in the feed.

Notable sites with activity streams
 Facebook's News Feed
 Gnip
 Salesforce.com's Chatter
 Traction TeamPage Release 5.0 adds activity streams to Enterprise 2.0 social software platform
 Twitter
 Tumblr
 Snapchat
 Spotify
 Pinterest

Notable software
 Eureka Streams
 Ektron CMS400.NET Release 8.0 adds activity streams to its social software suite

See also 
 Distributed social network
 OpenSocial
 Social networking service

References

External links
 Mirror Worlds Talk by David Gelernter on Compass Summit 2011

 Instagram's feed with images & videos
 New York Times news feed (on mobile)

Social networking services